Phyllanthus eximius is a species of plant in the family Phyllanthaceae. It is endemic to Jamaica.  It is threatened by habitat loss.

References

eximius
Vulnerable plants
Endemic flora of Jamaica
Taxonomy articles created by Polbot